Pirouz Joghtapour (born 29 April 1958) is an Iranian Football goalkeeper who played for F.C. Nassaji Mazandaran, Esteghlal F.C. and the Iran national football team.

References

External links

1958 births
Living people
Iranian footballers
Nassaji Mazandaran players
Esteghlal F.C. players
Iran international footballers
Sportspeople from Mazandaran province
Association football goalkeepers
People from Babol